These are the Lithuanian football standings from 1981 to 1990.

1981

 Auksciausia lyga
 
  1 Granitas Klaipeda         34 20 10  4  55- 22  33  50
  2 Kelininkas Kaunas         34 20  7  7  44- 20  24  47
  3 Pazanga Vilnius           34 18  9  7  35- 25  10  45
  4 Tauras Siauliai           34 17  8  9  51- 28  23  42
  5 Statybininkas Siauliai    34 15 12  7  41- 19  22  42
  6 Atmosfera Mazeikiai       34 13 13  8  34- 24  10  39
  7 Vienybe Ukmerge           34 14 11  9  33- 25   8  39
  8 Ekranas Panevezys         34 14  9 11  39- 34   5  37
  9 Politechnika Kaunas       34 10 15  9  27- 26   1  35
 10 Banga Kaunas              34 12  9 13  41- 40   1  33
 11 Inkaras Kaunas            34 12  9 13  41- 49  -8  33
 12 Ausra Vilnius             34 10 12 12  39- 38   1  32
 13 Statyba Jonava            34 11 10 13  35- 41  -6  32
 14 Nevezis Kedainiai         34 10  9 15  42- 47  -5  29
 15 Sviesa Vilnius            34 10  7 17  36- 48 -12  27
 16 Dainava Alytus            34  7  7 20  21- 55 -34  21
 17 Utenis Utena              34  7  4 23  25- 42 -17  18
 18 Sveikata Kybartai         34  3  6 25  30- 86 -56  12
  
  
 Promotion
   Atletas Kaunas
   Sirvinta Vilkaviskis
  
  
  
 CUP
 
 Semifinal
   Granitas Klaipeda - Elnias Siauliai  4:0
   Banga Kaunas - Nevezis Kedainiai  1:0
 
 Final
   Granitas Klaipeda - Banga Kaunas  2:0

1982

 Auksciausia lyga         
   
  1 Pazanga Vilnius           29 18 10  1  54- 20  34  46
  2 Granitas Klaipeda         29 17  8  4  45- 23  22  42
  3 Tauras Siauliai           29 16  8  5  41- 22  19  40
  4 Kelininkas Kaunas         29 14 11  4  47- 19  28  39
  5 Ekranas Panevezys         29 11 11  7  40- 24  16  33
  6 Atmosfera Mazeikiai       29 11 11  7  23- 17   6  33
  7 Ausra Vilnius             29 11  8 10  34- 33   1  30
  8 Statybininkas Siauliai    29  9 10 10  23- 22   1  28
  9 Banga Kaunas              29 11  5 13  35- 35   0  27
 10 Vienybe Ukmerge           29  9  8 12  38- 38   0  26
 11 Statyba Jonava            29  7 11 11  35- 36  -1  25
 12 Inkaras Kaunas            29  4 13 12  18- 34 -16  21
 13 Atletas Kaunas            29  5 10 14  18- 32 -14  20
 14 Politechnika Kaunas       29  6  8 15  29- 46 -17  20
 15 Sirvinta Vilkaviskis      29  4  3 22  20- 72 -52  11
 16 Jaunimo rinktine          15  2  3 10   5- 32 -27   7
 
 Promotion
   Mokslas Vilnius
   Nevezis Kedainiai
  
  
  
 CUP
  
 Semifinal
   Pazanga Vilnius - Vienybe Ukmerge  2:1  
   Nevezis Kedainiai - Dainava Alytus  2:0 
 
 Final
   Pazanga Vilnius - Nevezis Kedainiai  2:0

1983

 Auksciausia lyga
  
  1 Pazanga Vilnius           30 18  8  4  54- 28  26  44
  2 Granitas Klaipeda         30 18  5  7  51- 30  21  41
  3 Tauras Siauliai           30 15 10  5  51- 32  19  40
  4 Atmosfera Mazeikiai       30 14 12  4  39- 30   9  40
  5 Banga Kaunas              30 14 10  6  50- 33  17  38
  6 Kelininkas Kaunas         30 13 10  7  32- 27   5  36
  7 Nevezis Kedainiai         30 14  7  9  34- 40  -6  35
  8 Ekranas Panevezys         30 10  9 11  38- 32   6  29
  9 Statyba Jonava            30 10  9 11  39- 30   9  29
 10 Atletas Kaunas            30 10  7 13  29- 34  -5  27
 11 Politechnika Kaunas       30  8 11 11  25- 34  -9  27
 12 Vienybe Ukmerge           30  7 12 11  30- 35  -5  26
 13 Statybininkas Siauliai    30 10  5 15  28- 37  -9  25
 14 Inkaras Kaunas            30  9  5 16  32- 41  -9  23
 15 Mokslas Vilnius           30  3 10 17  16- 43 -27  16
 16 Ausra Vilnius             30  0  4 26  26- 68 -42   4
 
 Promotion
   SRT Vilnius
   Utenis Utena
  
  
  
 CUP
  
 Semifinal
   Granitas Klaipeda - Kelininkas Kaunas  3:1
   SRT Vilnius - Pazanga Vilnius  2:1
  
 Final
   Granitas Klaipeda - SRT Vilnius  2:1

1984

 Auksciausia lyga
 
  1 Granitas Klaipeda         34 23  7  4  76- 26  50  53
  2 Ekranas Panevezys         34 20  8  6  54- 34  20  48
  3 SRT Vilnius               34 17 12  5  56- 33  23  46
  4 Pazanga Vilnius           34 18  9  7  46- 29  17  45
  5 Banga Kaunas              34 14 12  8  45- 29  16  40
  6 Statyba Jonava            34 15 10  9  42- 48  -6  40
  7 Utenis Utena              34 15  4 15  40- 41  -1  34
  8 Statybininkas Siauliai    34 12 10 12  42- 44  -2  34
  9 Tauras Siauliai           34 12  9 13  47- 46   1  33
 10 Atmosfera Mazeikiai       34  9 15 10  27- 31  -4  33
 11 Vienybe Ukmerge           34 12  9 13  46- 41   5  33
 12 Kelininkas Kaunas         34 10 11 13  44- 46  -2  31
 13 Inkaras Kaunas            34  7 17 10  28- 34  -6  31
 14 Atletas Kaunas            34  9  9 16  26- 44 -18  27
 15 Nevezis Kedainiai         34  6 11 17  42- 57 -15  23
 16 Moksleiviu rinktine       34  6 10 18  26- 49 -23  22
 17 Politechnika Kaunas       34  5 10 19  14- 36 -22  20
 18 Zalgirietis Vilnius       34  3 13 18  18- 51 -33  19
 
 Promotion
   Aidas Kaunas
   Sveikata Kybartai
  
  
  
 CUP
  
 Semifinal
   SRT Vilnius - Syrius Klaipeda  2:0
   Banga Kaunas - Granitas Klaipeda  2:2 (3-2)  
 
 Final
   SRT Vilnius - Banga Kaunas  2:2 (3-1)

1985

 Auksciausia lyga
   
  1 Ekranas Panevezys         31 23  4  4  56- 18  38  50
  2 Granitas Klaipeda         31 20  6  5  60- 20  40  46
  3 SRT Vilnius               31 20  4  7  66- 25  41  44
  4 Pazanga Vilnius           31 19  6  6  38- 18  20  44
  5 Nevezis Kedainiai         31 12 13  6  42- 30  12  37
  6 Banga Kaunas              31 15  7  9  45- 23  22  37
  7 Atmosfera Mazeikiai       31 12  7 12  34- 32   2  31
  8 Kelininkas Kaunas         31 11  9 11  35- 38  -3  31
  9 Vienybe Ukmerge           31 11  7 13  34- 40  -6  29
 10 Utenis Utena              31 11  6 14  32- 38  -6  28
 11 Tauras Siauliai           31 11  6 14  36- 46 -10  28
 12 Inkaras Kaunas            31 10  6 15  36- 44  -8  26
 13 Aidas Kaunas              31  6 12 13  28- 46 -18  24
 14 Sveikata Kybartai         31  5  9 17  29- 65 -36  19
 15 Statybininkas Siauliai    31  5  9 17  16- 44 -28  19
 16 Statyba Jonava            31  4  7 20  26- 57 -31  15
 17 Jauniu rinktine           16  2  0 14   7- 36 -29   4
 
 Promotion
   Ausra Vilnius
   Kooperatininkas Plunge
  
  
 CUP
  
 Semifinal
   Ekranas Panevezys - SRT Vilnius  4:0
   Banga Kaunas - Granitas Klaipeda  3:2
 
 Final
   Ekranas Panevezys - Banga Kaunas  0:0 (4-3)

1986

 Auksciausia lyga
 
  1 Banga Kaunas              28 19  7  2  50- 13  37  45
  2 Granitas Klaipeda         28 18  7  3  55- 23  32  43
  3 Ekranas Panevezys         28 20  3  5  45- 21  24  43
  4 SRT Vilnius               28 13  6  9  39- 25  14  32
  5 Nevezis Kedainiai         28 12  6 10  31- 29   2  30
  6 Inkaras Kaunas            28 11  6 11  29- 28   1  28
  7 Atmosfera Mazeikiai       28  8 11  9  28- 33  -5  27
  8 Aidas Kaunas              28  8  9 11  32- 31   1  25
  9 Sveikata Kybartai         28  7 11 10  19- 34 -15  25
 10 Ausra Vilnius             28  7 10 11  23- 35 -12  24
 11 Tauras Siauliai           28  8  7 13  31- 36  -5  23
 12 Kelininkas Kaunas         28  6 11 11  20- 27  -7  23
 13 Utenis Utena              28  7  8 13  30- 46 -16  22
 14 Vienybe Ukmerge           28  6  7 15  23- 45 -22  19
 15 Kooperatininkas           28  3  5 20  17- 46 -29  11
 16 Pazanga Vilnius
 
 Promotion
   Statybininkas Siauliai
   Atletas Kaunas
   Poringe Alytus
   Tauras Taurage
  
  
 CUP
  
 Semifinal
   Granitas Klaipeda - Ekranas Panevezys  2:0
   Banga Kaunas - Suduva Kapsukas  2:1 
 
 Final
   Granitas Klaipeda - Banga Kaunas  3:1

1987

 Auksciausia lyga
 
  1 Tauras Taurage            32 23  7  2  48- 15  33  53
  2 SRT Vilnius               32 25  3  4  65- 18  47  53
  3 Inkaras Kaunas            32 19  8  5  60- 27  33  46
  4 Atmosfera Mazeikiai       32 18  8  6  51- 28  23  44
  5 Ekranas Panevezys         32 20  3  9  65- 36  29  43
  6 Granitas Klaipeda         32 14  9  9  44- 32  12  37
  7 Statybininkas Siauliai    32 12  8 12  42- 35   7  32
  8 Banga Kaunas              32 12  8 12  45- 33  12  32
  9 Nevezis Kedainiai         32 11  9 12  45- 51  -6  31
 10 Kelininkas Kaunas         32 12  7 13  27- 28  -1  31
 11 Aidas Kaunas              32 11  4 17  39- 54 -15  26
 12 Atletas Kaunas            32  8  9 15  25- 40 -15  25
 13 Poringe Alytus            32  7 10 15  31- 56 -25  24
 14 Sveikata Kybartai         32  7  8 17  19- 47 -28  22
 15 Tauras Siauliai           32  5  6 21  29- 61 -32  16
 16 Ausra Vilnius             32  2 11 19  29- 63 -34  15
 17 Utenis Utena              32  5  4 23  27- 67 -40  14
 
 Final
  
   Tauras Taurage - SRT Vilnius  2:2 (3-2) 
  
 Promotion
   Suduva Kapsukas
   Automobilistas Klaipeda    
   Vienybe Ukmerge
   Statyba Jonava
  
 
 CUP
 
 Semifinal 
   SRT Vilnius - Granitas Klaipeda  2:1
   Inkaras Kaunas - Banga Kaunas  2:0
 
 Final
   SRT Vilnius - Inkaras Kaunas  0:0 (5-4)

1988

 Auksciausia lyga
  
  1 SRT Vilnius               30 18 11  1  70- 26  44  47
  2 Inkaras Kaunas            30 16 13  1  47- 20  27  45
  3 Ekranas Panevezys         30 17  8  5  52- 20  32  42
  4 Kelininkas Kaunas         30 14  9  7  46- 31  15  37
  5 Atmosfera Mazeikiai       30 16  5  9  49- 31  18  37
  6 Banga Kaunas              30 12 12  6  39- 22  17  36
  7 Tauras Taurage            30 14  7  9  48- 37  11  35
  8 Granitas Klaipeda         30 12  8 10  65- 34  31  32
  9 Statybininkas Siauliai    30 11  8 11  32- 31   1  30
 10 Vienybe Ukmerge           30 12  5 13  38- 49 -11  29
 11 Poringe Alytus            30  8 12 10  41- 48  -7  28
 12 Suduva Marijampole        30  6 10 14  39- 43  -4  22
 13 Atletas Kaunas            30  7  8 15  34- 43  -9  22
 14 Statyba Jonava            30  7  4 19  31- 62 -31  18
 15 Nevezis Kedainiai         30  5  7 18  37- 59 -22  17
 16 Automobilistas Klaipeda   30  1  1 28  17-129-112   3
  
 Promotion
   Neris Vilnius
   Sirijus Klaipeda
  
  
 CUP
 
 Semifinal
   Sirijus Klaipeda - Ekranas Panevezys  4:0
   Kelininkas Kaunas - SRT Vilnius  2:1
 
 Final
   Sirijus Klaipeda - Kelininkas Kaunas  3:2

1989

 Auksciausia lyga 
  
  1 Banga Kaunas              29 17  9  3  48- 16  32  43
  2 Ekranas Panevezys         29 17  8  4  51- 19  32  42
  3 Sirijus Klaipeda          29 16  7  6  36- 21  15  39
  4 Granitas Klaipeda         29 14  7  8  54- 32  22  35
  5 Tauras Taurage            29 13  9  7  40- 26  14  35
  6 Atmosfera Mazeikiai       29 14  6  9  36- 28   8  34
  7 Gel. Vilkas Vilnius       29 13  8  8  29- 24   5  34
  8 Kelininkas Kaunas         29 12  7 10  43- 35   8  31
  9 Atletas Kaunas            29 11  7 11  34- 38  -4  29
 10 Statybininkas Siauliai    29 10  3 16  26- 41 -15  23
 11 Vienybe Ukmerge           29  9  4 16  34- 37  -3  22
 12 Poringe Alytus            29  7  7 15  27- 77 -50  21
 13 Neris Vilnius             29  6  8 15  30- 44 -14  20
 14 Suduva Marijampole        29  6  4 19  26- 43 -17  16
 15 Lietuvos j. r.            15  6  3  6  16- 17  -1  15
 16 Statyba Jonava            29  3  5 21  22- 54 -32  11
   
 Promotion
   Tauras Siauliai
   Panerys Vilnius
   Neris Vilnius - Mastis Telsiai  0:0  3:1
   Suduva Marijampole - Poli Kaunas  2:0  2:0
  
  
 CUP
  
 Semifinal
   Tauras Taurage - Geguzes pirmoji Jurbarkas  3: 
   Banga Kaunas - Vienybe Ukmerge  2:1 
  
 Final
   Banga Kaunas - Tauras Taurage  2:0

1990

 Baltic Championship
 
  1 ZALGIRIS VILNIUS          32 27  4  1 104- 11  93  58
  2 SIRIJUS KLAIPEDA          32 19  9  4  47- 19  28  47
  3 EKRANAS PANEVEZYS         32 19  8  5  62- 24  38  46
  4 Progress Cherniah. (RUS)  32 19  4  9  46- 33  13  42
  5 JOVARAS MAZEIKIAI         32 16  8  8  40- 25  15  40
  6 INKARAS KAUNAS            32 15  9  8  54- 25  29  39
  7 BANGA KAUNAS              32 13 11  8  45- 30  15  37
  8 RAF Elgava (LAT)          32 13 10  9  44- 37   7  36
  9 SAKALAS SIAULIAI          32 11 12  9  41- 32   9  34
 10 Sport Tallinn (EST)       32 11 11 10  43- 39   4  33
 11 NERIS VILNIUS             32 10  8 14  27- 47 -20  28
 12 Stroitel Daugavpils (LAT) 32  8  7 17  29- 45 -16  23
 13 Torpedo Riga (LAT)        32  6 10 16  29- 49 -20  22
 14 KKI Daugava Riga (LAT)    32  4 13 15  16- 49 -33  21
 15 Pardaugava Riga (LAT)     32  5  8 19  24- 53 -29  18
 16 Metallurgs Liepaja (LAT)  32  4  5 23  20- 97 -77  13
 17 SUDUVA MARIJAMPOLE        32  1  5 26  13- 69 -56   7
  
  
 Lithuanian Auksciausia lyga  
  
  1 Panerys Vilnius           32 20  6  4  48- 18  30  46
  2 Granitas Klaipeda         32 20  6  4  57- 16  41  46
  3 Sirijietis Klaipeda       32 14  9  7  38- 27  11  37
  4 Elektronas Taurage        32 15  6  9  35- 29   6  36
  5 Vienybe Ukmerge           32 14  8  8  51- 32  19  36
  6 Vilija Kaunas             32 14  7  9  64- 39  25  35
  7 Atletas Kaunas            32 11 11  8  30- 22   8  33
  8 Tauras Siauliai           32 13  6 11  53- 41  12  32
  9 Viltis Vilnius            32 10 10 10  50- 32  18  30
 10 Dainava Alytus            32 11  7 12  33- 46 -13  29
 11 Nevezis Kedainiai         32 10  7 13  40- 40   0  27
 12 Gel. Vilkas Vilnius       32 10  7 13  39- 41  -2  27
 13 Politechnika Kaunas       32  8  6 16  27- 56 -29  22
 14 Mastis Telsiai            32  5 10 15  28- 55 -27  20
 15 Sveikata Kybartai         32  5  6 19  20- 61 -41  16
 16 Sirvinta Vilkaviskis      32  2  4 24  19- 77 -58   8
  
  
 Lithuanian Championship Play-Off
  
 1/4 Final
   Zalgiris Vilnius - Elektronas Taurage  6:0  3:0
   Ekranas Panevezys - Granitas Klaipeda  1:1  2:0
   Panerys Vilnius - Jovaras Mazeikiai  1:0  1:1
   Sirijus Klaipeda - Sirijietis Klaipeda  2:0  1:2
   
 Semifinal
   Ekranas Panevezys - Zalgiris Vilnius  2:0  0:1
   Sirijus Klaipeda - Panerys Vilnius  3:2  2:1
 
 3rd place
   Zalgiris Vilnius - Panerys Vilnius  1:0
 
 Final
 
   Sirijus Klaipeda - Ekranas Panevezys  0:0 (3-2)
  
  
  
 CUP
  
 Semifinal
   Zalgiris Vilnius - Neris Vilnius  4:0
   Sirijus Klaipeda - Jovaras Mazeikiai  1:0
  
 Final
   Sirijus Klaipeda - Zalgiris Vilnius  0:0 (4-3)

Sources
RSSF/Almantas Lahzadis

Football in Lithuania